Fierce Panda Records is a UK based independent record label especially well known for their compilation albums and EPs. These are traditionally named after a pun or in-joke, and are usually deleted on the day of release. A list of these and some of the most famous bands featured is below.

Discography

Albums 

NB: Catalogue numbers of singles released on Fierce Panda Records begin with the characters "NING" resulting in the titles of many of the above items being in-joke puns.

EPs

NB: Shagging In The Streets was the first ever Fierce Panda release.

See also
 Fierce Panda Records
 List of bands signed to Fierce Panda Records

References 

Record label compilation albums
Fierce Records